CINU-FM is a Canadian religious broadcasting radio station, broadcasting from Truro, Nova Scotia on 106.3 FM and is branded Hope 106.3 FM. The station has been on the air since September 2003 after receiving CRTC approval in June of that same year.

Programs on the station have included the now defunct nationally syndicated CT-20 countdown of Christian music hits.

On September 3, 2009, the station received approval to move from its old FM frequency of 98.5 to a new FM frequency at 106.3 MHz. The station also received approval in part to use 106.1 MHz.

References

External links
 Hope 106.3 FM
 

Inu
Inu
Truro, Nova Scotia
Radio stations established in 2003
2003 establishments in Nova Scotia